Lyndon Street Townhouses are four historic rowhouses located at Greensboro, Guilford County, North Carolina. They were built about 1905, and is a two-story, three bay, brick structure with Colonial Revival and Queen Anne style design elements.  Each house features a polygonal bay window at the second story and they are united by a full-width porch supported by seven Doric order columns raised on tall brick piers.

It was listed on the National Register of Historic Places in 1992.

References

Houses on the National Register of Historic Places in North Carolina
Queen Anne architecture in North Carolina
Colonial Revival architecture in North Carolina
Houses completed in 1905
Houses in Greensboro, North Carolina
National Register of Historic Places in Guilford County, North Carolina
1905 establishments in North Carolina